Gillette College is a two-year community college in Gillette, Wyoming. The college is operated by the Northern Wyoming Community College District. The college offers Associate of Arts and Associate of Science degrees, as well as certificate and applied science programs that prepare students for skilled trades such as welding and industrial electricity.

Academics
The estimated tuition for the 2018–19 year with 15 credits per semester was $12,439 for Wyoming residents, $13,567 for Western Undergraduate Exchange (WUE) students, and $16,951 for out-of-state and international students. The amount includes an average cost of books, supplies, and room and board. The cost per credit is $132 for Wyoming Residents, $179 for WUE students, and $320 for out-of-state and international students for the first 11 credits and begins to decrease ending with 18 credits costing $100 each.

The nursing program at the college started in January 1983 and it accepted 15 students a year to become licensed practical nurses (LPN). The program expanded to include training registered nurses (RN) in 1987. The nursing program currently accepts 32 students a year and in 2017, 244 people applied to enter the program which starts each year in the Fall.

Student life

Athletics
A member of the National Junior College Athletic Association, Gillette College, competed in men's and women's basketball, men's and women's soccer and rodeo in Region IX. The rodeo team was a member of the National Intercollegiate Rodeo Association.

Notable alumni
Deishuan Booker (born 1996), basketball player in the Israeli Basketball Premier League

Gallery

See also
Sheridan College

References

External links

Official website

1969 establishments in Wyoming
Community colleges in Wyoming
Education in Campbell County, Wyoming
Educational institutions established in 1969
Gillette, Wyoming